Wawrzynowo  is a settlement in the administrative district of Gmina Kościerzyna, within Kościerzyna County, Pomeranian Voivodeship, in northern Poland.

For details of the history of the region, see History of Pomerania.

The nearest airports

GDN	Gdańsk Lech Wałęsa Airport – 53 km
BZG	Bydgoszcz Ignacy Jan Paderewski Airport – 105 km
OSZ	Koszalin-Zegrze Pomorskie Airport – 107 km

References

Wawrzynowo